The Derna oil field is a shale oil field located in Derna, Bihor County. It was discovered in 1900 but remained undeveloped.

References

Oil fields in Romania
Geography of Bihor County